U Sports women's basketball is the highest level of play of women's basketball at the university level under the auspices of U Sports, Canada's governing body for university sports. There are 48 teams, all of which are based in Canada, that are divided into four conferences that are eligible to compete for the year-end championship. As these players compete at the university level, they are obligated to follow the rule of standard eligibility of five years. The winning team of the U Sports women's basketball championship is awarded the Bronze Baby trophy. The championship has been played for since 1972, with the UBC Thunderettes capturing the inaugural championship.

History

Participating universities 
As of the 2019–2020 U Sports season, 48 of the 56 U Sports member institutions have women's basketball teams. The teams are split into four conferences with some conferences splitting teams further into divisions. With the addition of Ontario Tech for the 2019–20 season, the OUA moved to three six-team divisions. The Canada West conference had two divisions, but reverted to a one conference format for the 2016–17 season with 17 teams. The AUS conference has eight teams while the RSEQ conference has five.

Atlantic University Sport

Canada West Universities Athletic Association

Ontario University Athletics

East Division

West Division

Central Division

Réseau du sport étudiant du Québec

Conference championships

Critelli Cup (OUA) 
The OUA postseason tournament champions are awarded the Critelli Cup.

Championships by School 

MRC = Most Recent Championship
MRA = Most Recent Appearance

Atlantic University Sport 

2013-14: Saint Mary's
2012-13: Saint Mary's 
2011-12: Acadia 
2010-11: Cape Breton 

2008-09: Cape Breton
2007-08: Memorial 
2006-07: Memorial 
2005-06: Cape Breton
2004-05: Memorial 
1990-91: UNB

1970-71: UNB	

1959-60: UNB
1958-59: UNB		
1957-58: Mt. Allison
1956-57: UNB
1955-56: Dalhousie		
1954-55: Dalhousie	
1953-54: Dalhousie	
1952-53: Dalhousie	
1951-52: Acadia

Canada West

Championships by School

Awards and honours

U Sports championship MVP 

2019-20 Sabine Dukate, Saskatchewan
2018-19 Linnaea Harper, McMaster
2017-18 Elizabeth Leblanc, Carleton
2016-17 Alex Kiss-Rusk, McGill
2015-16 Dalyce Emmerson, Saskatchewan
2014-15 Korissa Williams, Windsor
2013-14 Miah-Marie Langlois, Windsor
2012-13 Korissa Williams, Windsor
2011-12 Miah-Marie Langlois, Windsor
2010-11 Miah-Marie Langlois, Windsor
2009-10 Robyn Buna, Simon Fraser
2008-09 Matteke Hutzler, Simon Fraser
2007-08 Erica McGuinness, UBC
2006-07 Laurelle Weigl, Simon Fraser
2005-06 Kelsey Blair, UBC
2004-05 Dani Langford, Simon Fraser
2003-04 Carrie Watson, UBC
2002-03 Lindsay Anderson, Victoria
2001-02 Teresa Kleindienst, Simon Fraser
2000-01 Cymone Bouchard, Regina
1999-00 Lindsay Brooke, Victoria
1998-99 Jackie Simon, Alberta
1997-98 Lindsay Brooke, Victoria
1996-97 Terri-Lee Johannesson, Manitoba
1995-96 Terri-Lee Johannesson, Manitoba
1994-95 Sandra Carroll, Winnipeg
1993-94 Sandra Carroll, Winnipeg
1992-93 Michelle Chambers, Winnipeg
1991-92 Jenny Sutton, Victoria
1990-91 Dianne Norman, Laurentian
1989-90 Shirlene McLean, Laurentian
1988-89 Veronica VanderSchee, Calgary
1987-88 Kim Bertholet, Manitoba
1986-87 Janet Fowler, Victoria
1985-86 Angela Orton, Toronto
1984-85 Lori Clarke, Victoria
1983-84 (*) Andrea Blackwell and Lynn Polson, Bishop's
1982-83 Andrea Blackwell, Bishop's
1981-82 Luanne Hebb, Victoria
1980-81 Shelly Godfrey, Victoria
1979-80 Carol Turney-Loos, Victoria
1978-79 Sylvia Sweeney, Laurentian
1977-78 Debbie Huband, Bishop’s
 co-winners/co-gagnants

Player of the year (Nan Copp Award) 

2019-20 Jenna Mae Ellsworth, UPEI
2018-19 Sarah-Jane Marois, Laval
2017-18 Paloma Andreson, Acadia
2016-17 Danielle Boiago, McMaster
2015-16 Keneca Pingue-Giles, Ryerson
2014-15 Jylisa Williams, Lakehead
2013-14 Justine Colley, Saint Mary’s
2012-13 Justine Colley, Saint Mary’s
2011-12 Hannah Sunley-Paisley, Ottawa
2010-11 Jessica Clemençon, Windsor
2009-10 Robyn Buna Simon, Fraser
2008-09 Kayla Dykstra, Victoria
2007-08 Lani Gibbons, Simon Fraser
2006-07 Sarah Crooks, Saskatchewan
2005-06 Sarah Crooks, Saskatchewan
2004-05 JoAnne Wells, Winnipeg
2003-04 Cymone Bouchard, Regina
2002-03 Jessica Kaczowka, Simon Fraser
2001-02 Jessica Kaczowka Simon Fraser
2000-01 Leighann Doan, Calgary
1999-00 Leighann Doan, Calgary
1998-99 Corrin Wersta, Regina
1997-98 Anne Smith, Manitoba
1996-97 Vicky Tessier, McGill
1995-96 Justine Ellison, Toronto
1994-95 Sandra Carroll, Winnipeg
1993-94 Sandra Carroll, Winnipeg
1992-93 Sandra Carroll, Winnipeg
1991-92 Susan Stewart, Laurentian
1990-91 Jodi Evans, Calgary
1989-90 Veronica VanderSchee, Calgary
1988-89 Kim Bertholet, Manitoba
1987-88 Veronica VanderSchee, Calgary
1986-87 Lori Clarke, Victoria
1985-86 Pat Melville, Toronto
1984-85 Carol Hamilton, Laurentian
1983-84 Andrea Blackwell, Bishop's
1982-83 Tracie McAra, Victoria
1981-82 Luanne Hebb, Victoria
1980-81 Janis Paskevich, Calgary
1979-80 Carol Turney-Loos, Victoria

Rookie of the year 
Kathy Shields Award

2019-20 Jael Kabunda, Bishop’s
2018-19 Myriam Leclerc, Concordia
2017-18 Carolina Gonçalves, Regina
2016-17 Kyanna Giles, Regina
2015-16 Brooklyn Legault, Alberta
2014-15 Bridget Atkinson, Guelph
2013-14 Alison Keough, Cape Breton
2012-13 Mariam Sylla, McGill
2011-12 Vanessa Pickard, StFX
2010-11 Claire Colborne, UNB
2009-10 Jessica Clemençon, Windsor
2008-09 Chanelle St-Amour, Laval
2007-08 Cora Duval, UQAM
2006-07 Laurelle Weigl, Simon Fraser
2005-06 Amanda Anderson Western
2004-05 Laura MacCallum, York
2003-04 Cassandra Carpenter, Laurentian
2002-03 Kelsey Blair, UBC
2001-02 Julie Devenny, Waterloo
2000-01 Josée Lalonde, Laval
1999-00 Julie Galipeau, Saint Mary's
1998-99 Danielle Everitt, McMaster
1997-98 Valérie Samson, Laval
1996-97 Leighann Doan, Calgary
1995-96 Andrea Gottselig, Regina
1994-95 Marjorie Kelly, Manitoba
1993-94 Carolyn Wares, Dalhousie
1992-93 Vicky Tessier, McGill
1991-92 Theresa McCuish, StFX
1990-91 Darcel Wright, Ryerson
1989-90 Dianne Norman, Laurentian

Defensive Player of the year 

2019-20 Khaléann Caron-Goudreau, Laval
2018-19 Khaléann Caron-Gaudreau, Laval
2017-18 Elizabeth Leblanc, Carleton
2016-17 Antoinette Miller, Winnipeg
2015-16 Kennisha-Shanice Luberisse, Saint Mary’s
2014-15 Korissa Williams, Windsor
2013-14 Miah-Marie Langlois, Windsor
2012-13 Miah-Marie Langlois, Windsor
2011-12 Miah-Marie Langlois, Windsor
2010-11 Katie Miyazaki, Saskatchewan
2009-10 Katie Miyazaki, Simon Fraser
2008-09 Leanne Evans, UBC
2007-08 Rachel Hart, ** McMaster
2006-07 Rachel Hart, Manitoba
2005-06 Chiara Rocca, McMaster
2004-05 Jody Potts, Victoria
2003-04 Carrie Watson, UBC
2002-03 Cymone Bouchard, Regina
2001-02 Teresa Kleindienst, * Simon Fraser
Clare Beatty, * Laurentian
2000-01 Marjorie Kelly, Manitoba

Outstanding student-athlete 	
Sylvia Sweeney Award

2019-20 Julia Curran, Western
2018-19 Hilary Hanaka, McMaster
2017-18 Kiera Rigby, UPEI
2016-17 Katie Ross, Acadia
2015-16 Ainsley MacIntyre, Dalhousie
2014-15 Kimberley Veldman, Lethbridge
2013-14 Hailey Milligan, McMaster
2012-13 Alexa McCarthy, Fraser Valley
2011-12 Lindsay Druery, Lakehead
2010-11 Jill Humbert, Saskatchewan
2009-10 Michele Hynes, Manitoba
2008-09 Courtney Gerwing, Simon Fraser
2007-08 Michelle Buhler, UCFV
2006-07 Stephanie Yallin, Guelph
2005-06 Michelle Smith, Alberta
2004-05 Maria-Jose Raposo, Concordia
2003-04 Krystal O'Bryne, Victoria
2002-03 Anna Drewniak, Manitoba
2001-02 Jacqueline Lavallée, Saskatchewan
2000-01 Lindsay Brooke, Victoria
1999-00 Andrea Gottselig, Regina
1998-99 Rania Burns, Alberta
1997-98 Shelly Dewar, Laurentian
1996-97 Nadine Fennig, Alberta
1995-96 Jaylene Morrison, Queen’s
1994-95 Adair Duncan, UBC
1993-94 Larisa Waschuk, Winnipeg

Coach of the Year
Peter Ennis Award

2019-20 Mike Rao, Brock
2018-19 Guillaume Giroux, Laval
2017-18 Taffe Charles, Carleton
2016-17 Dave Wilson, Queen’s
2015-16 Ryan Thorne, McGill
2014-15 Chantal Vallée, Windsor
2013-14 Chantal Vallée, Windsor
2012-13 Scott Munro, Saint Mary’s
2011-12 Dave Taylor, Regina
2010-11 Lisa Thomaidis, Saskatchewan
2009-10 Brian Cheng, Victoria
2008-09 Lisa Thomaidis, Saskatchewan
2007-08 Theresa Burns, McMaster
2006-07 Scott Edwards, Alberta
2005-06 Fabian McKenzie, Cape Breton
2004-05 Bruce Langford, Simon Fraser
2003-04 Debbie Huband, UBC
2002-03 Douglas Partridge, Memorial
2001-02 Bruce Langford, Simon Fraser
2000-01 Linda Marquis, Laval
1999-00 Linda Marquis, Laval
1998-99 Kathy Shields, Victoria
1997-98 Coleen Dufresne, Manitoba
1996-97 Christine Stapleton, Regina
1995-96 Ron Carew, Cape Breton
1994-95 Tom Kendall, Winnipeg
1993-94 Tom Kendall, Winnipeg
1992-93 Tom Kendall, Winnipeg
1991-92 Kathy Shields, Victoria
1990-91 Peter Ennis, Laurentian
1989-90 Donna Rudakas, Calgary
1988-89 Donna Rudakas, Calgary
1987-88 Coleen Dufresne, Manitoba
1986-87 Peter Ennis, Laurentian
1985-86 Sherry Melney, Alberta
1984-85 Louisa Zerbe, Lethbridge
1983-84 Wayne Hussey, Bishop’s
1982-83 Coleen Dufresne, UNB
1981-82 Tom Kendall, Winnipeg
1980-81 Wayne Hussey, Bishop’s
1979-80 Kathy Shields, Victoria
1978-79 Marilyn McNeil, Calgary
1977-78 Mike Gallo, Victoria

Fair Play Award
R.W. Pugh Fair Play Award

2019-20 Not Awarded
2018-19 Not awarded
2017-18 Not awarded
2016-17 Not awarded
2015-16 Krista Van Slingerland, Ottawa
2014-15 Ryerson University
2013-14 Jessica Clemençon, Windsor
2012-13 Not awarded
2011-12 Not awarded
2010-11 Ashley Stephen, StFX
2009-10 Lindsay DeGroot, Saskatchewan
2008-09 Not awarded
2007-08 Not awarded
2006-07 Julia Wilson, Simon Fraser

Perseverence Award
Tracy MacLeod Award

2019-20 Addison Martin, Manitoba
2018-19 Lanae Adams, Acadia
2017-18 Lena Wenke, Winnipeg
2016-17 Vanessa Pickard, McMaster
2015-16 Krista Van Slingerland, Ottawa
2014-15 Kellie Ring, Ottawa
2013-14 Gemma Bullard, Queen’s
2012-13 Amber Hillis, Wilfrid Laurier
2011-12 Laura Mullins, Windsor
2010-11 Brittany Dalton, Memorial
2009-10 Anneth Him-Lazarenko, McGill
2008-09 Vanessa Forstbauer, Victoria
2007-08 Rachel Hart, McMaster
2006-07 Julia Wilson, Simon Fraser
2005-06 Devon Campbell, Simon Fraser
2004-05 Cory Bekkering, Calgary
2003-04 Heather Thompson, Winnipeg
2002-03 Fiona Tozer, Brock
2001-02 Debra Hidson, Calgary
2000-01 Nicole Poier, Saskatchewan
1999-00 Janet Wells, Dalhousie
1998-99 Angela Hrkac, Lakehead
1997-98 Patricia Wood, Brandon
1996-97 Karen Arnott, Guelph

Top 100
In celebration of the centennial anniversary of U SPORTS women’s basketball, a committee of U SPORTS women’s basketball coaches and partners revealed a list of the Top 100 women's basketball players. Commemorating the 100th anniversary of the first Canadian university women’s contest between the Queen’s Gaels and McGill Martlets on Feb. 6, 1920, the list of the Top 100 was gradually revealed over four weeks. Culminating with the All-Canadian Gala, which also recognized national award winners.

1930-1980

1980 to 1990

1990 to 2000

2001-2010

2011-2020

References

 
U Sports basketball